The 2014–15 VTB United League was the 6th complete season of the VTB United League. It was the second season in which the VTB United League functioned as the new domestic first tier level for Russian professional basketball clubs, which can qualify through this league to EuroLeague.

CSKA Moscow was the defending champion. CSKA successfully defended its title, as they took the league title by beating Khimki 3–0 in the Finals.

Teams 
On 20 July 2014, drawing of two group of 11 teams was held in Moscow. On 25 July 2014, five Lithuanian teams (Lietuvos rytas, Neptūnas Klaipėda, Dzūkija, Lietkabelis, Nevėžis) withdrew from the competition due to the Lithuanian Basketball League's decision to expand its regular-season schedule up to 40 games per team. New format with double round-robin tournament was proposed for the 2014–15 VTB United League.

This proposal for the regular season was approved on 1 August 2014. The eight best teams of the regular season will qualify to the playoffs.

Regular season

Playoffs

Awards

Most Valuable Player

MVP of the Month

Player statistics

Points

Assists

Rebounds

Efficiency

References

External links 
Official website 
Official website 

2014–15
2014–15 in European basketball leagues
2014–15 in Russian basketball
2014–15 in Finnish basketball
2014–15 in Latvian basketball
2014–15 in Estonian basketball
2014–15 in Belarusian basketball
2014–15 in Kazakhstani basketball
2014–15 in Czech basketball